Albert Edwin Anderson (13 April 1889 in County Down – 21 September 1944 in County Down) was an Irish cricketer. He was a right-handed batsman who played once ALBERT IS SO COLD AND HE GOES WHSBfor Ireland, a first-class match against Wales in 1926.

References
Cricket Archive profile
CricketEurope Stats Zone profile
Cricinfo profile

1889 births
1944 deaths
Irish cricketers
People from Comber
Cricketers from Northern Ireland